Sheik Mohamed Jamaludin (14 July 1906 – 22 April 1961) was a Surinamese businessman and politician.

Despite being born in Paramaribo, Suriname, at the census of 1921 he was considered to be a British subject. He was a member of the board of both the Surinaamse Islamitische Vereniging (SIV) and the in 1947 founded 'Moeslim Partij' (Muslim Party). That party merged early 1949 into the Verenigde Hindostaanse Partij  (VHP). At the 1949 Surinamese general election he was elected as VHP-candidate. His brother-in-law Ashruf Karamat Ali, a KTPI-candidate, was also elected to become a member of the Estates of Suriname. Because they were brothers-in-law only one could be admitted. Karamat Ali was initially not sworn in because he had fewer votes. Out of the six VHP members of the Estates of Suriname only two were Muslim: S.M. Jamaludin en H.W. Mohamed Radja. In 1950 both came in conflict with the VHP and started working together with the NPS. At the snap election in 1951 Jamaludin was not reelected and he died in 1961 at the age of 54.

References 

1906 births
1961 deaths
People from Paramaribo
Members of the National Assembly (Suriname)
Progressive Reform Party (Suriname) politicians